Stapac Jakarta is one of Indonesia's top basketball clubs. They have won 13 national championships, entering the finals of the top-tier domestic competition started from Kobatama and IBL, since its founding in 1986. Historically, the team has sent about half of its players to represent Indonesia in international basketball.

History 
Formerly known as XL ASPAC Texmaco Jakarta, the team renamed itself with the entry of a new main sponsor, the computer giant Dell. From 2003 to 2007, Aspac has appeared in the finals of the now-defunct Indonesian Basketball League, losing in 2004, 2006, and 2007 to Jakarta rivals Satria Muda. In 2005, Aspac became the first professional basketball team to finish undefeated (22–0) in a top-tier Indonesian league by beating Satria Muda, 2–0, in a best-of-three showdown. They also became the first team to win the Indonesian championship five times. They have defunct since 2020 because most of their players were called up to national team.

NBL Era

IBL Era

Achievements 
FIBA Asia Champions Cup
Third place (1): 1997

History

Mario, Andi, Thoyib, and Denny Era (1997–2009) 
This is the beginning of Aspac dominance in Indonesian basketball. It started with stars Andi and Denny in 2000. Aspac became champion of KOBATAMA for the first time under their strong play. Then, came a young Indonesian named Mario Wuysang who spent his childhood in the US and played for Indiana University – Purdue University Fort Wayne of the NCAA Division II. Mario Wuysang was eventually regarded as the best Indonesian point guard ever. The joining of Mario Wuysang gave a big impact to Aspac, bringing in two IBL titles in 2003 and 2005. Isman Thoyib who was 2.01 meters tall, which was considered very tall in Indonesia at that time, also provided a great interior presence. Under the stellar play of their stars, Aspac was always a favorite to win the title.

Xaverius Era (2010–2015) 
Xaverius Prawiro is an important icon of Aspac Jakarta. He led Aspac to two championships. His leadership proved vital in the championships. With his experience and strong mentality, he willed Aspac to victory in a lot of crucial games. However, he decided to retire at the age of 28 because he failed to bring Aspac a championship in 2015. Many questioned his decision to retire because he was still in his prime.

Naturalization Era (2013–2016) 
Biboy or Ebrahim Enguio Lopez is the first naturalized player in Indonesia. Discovered by Aspac owners, Biboy is a Filipino player who was half-Indonesian from his Balinese father. Biboy took the league by storm debuting with 31 Point for Aspac and claiming the Rookie of the Year and Sixthman of the Year awards in 2014. With his help, Aspac again became champion in 2014. However, with the introduction of imports into the league, Biboy was eventually cut as he was also considered an import by the league.

The New Era of Aspac (2017–Present) 
A new era for Aspac was spearheaded by young players such as Abraham Damar, Andakara Prastawa, Kristian Liem, Widhyanta and Vincent Kosasih which brought change to the Aspac team. Prastawa and Kristian Liem were the Rookie of the Year in their respective years. At 2,03 meters, Kristian proved very helpful in terms of rebounding. Joining them is Widhyanta Putra Tedja, who is regarded as the best point guard in the class of 2015. At the young age of 18, he managed to score 15 points in the Finals of Pre-Season IBL. Abraham, who joined in 2015, also made a big impact for the team with his sharpshooting and basketball IQ. Last is Vincent Kosasih who stands at 2,06 meters. A promising prospect, he played for the Indonesian national team in the 2017 SEA Games and won the Silver Medal. With their collection of young talent, Aspac has a promising future in the league.

Roster

Stapac Legends

Individual awards

Most Valuable Player 

 Denny Sumargo (2003, 2008)
 Pringgo Regowo (2013)
 Kaleb Ramot Gemilang (2019)

Rookie of the Year 

 Denny Sumargo (2001)
 Mario Wuysang (2002)
 Andakara Prastawa (2013)
 Ebrahim Enguio Lopez (2014)

 Kristian Liem (2015)

Agassi Goantara (2019)

Sixthman of the Year 

 Andakara Prastawa (2013,2016,2018)
 Ebrahim Enguio Lopez (2014)
Abraham Damar Grahita (2019)

Final MVP 

 Fandi Andika Ramadhani (2013)
 Andakara Prastawa (2014)

All Defensive Team 

 Denny Sumargo (2001–2006)

First Team NBL Indonesia 

 Pringgo Regowo (2013)

Notable former players
- Set a club record or won an individual award as a professional player.
- Played at least one official international match for his senior national team at any time.
  Mei Joni
AF Rinaldo

Bobby Parks

Kenny Travis

Filiks Bendatu

Dwayne McClain

Muhammad Rifky

Mintarya

Tri Adnyana Adiloka

Opung Radja

Riko Hantono

Alkristian Chandra

Cokorda Raka

Mario Gerungan

Ebrahim Enguio Lopez

Xaverius Prawiro

Denny Sumargo

Fictor Roring

Mario Wuysang

Andi Poedjakesuma

Athmadi Dimas Mahendra

Suwandi Menara

References

Website 
Official website

Basketball teams in Indonesia
Basketball teams established in 1986
Basketball teams disestablished in 2020
1986 establishments in Indonesia
2020 disestablishments in Indonesia